Gary Vidal  (born in 1965) is a Canadian politician who was elected to represent the riding of Desnethé—Missinippi—Churchill River in the House of Commons of Canada in the 2019 Canadian federal election. Vidal previously served as mayor of Meadow Lake, Saskatchewan from 2011 until his resignation in April 2019.

Electoral record

Federal

Municipal

References

External links
 

Living people
Conservative Party of Canada MPs
Mayors of places in Saskatchewan
People from Meadow Lake, Saskatchewan
Members of the House of Commons of Canada from Saskatchewan
Year of birth uncertain
Canadian accountants
1965 births